Christian IV Glacier ( or Kong Christian den IV's Gletscher) is a large glacier on the east coast of the Greenland ice sheet. It is named after King Christian IV of Denmark (1577 – 1648). Administratively this glacier is part of the Sermersooq Municipality. The area surrounding Christian IV Glacier is uninhabited.

Geography
The Christian IV Glacier is a non-surge type valley glacier that does not drain the ice sheet directly, but flows partly from it across the mountainous areas of the Gronau Nunataks through the Gronau Glacier and the Grønlands Styrelse Glacier tributaries. Further south it separates the Lindbergh Range in the west from the Watkins Range in the east, flowing in a roughly north–south direction until its terminus at the head of the Nansen Fjord in the East Greenland coast.

This fast-flowing glacier is similar in structure to the neighbouring Kronborg Glacier.

See also
List of glaciers in Greenland

Further reading
Spencer Apollonio, Lands That Hold One Spellbound: A Story of East Greenland, 2008

References

External links
 Forbidden Coast - Aurora Arktika

Glaciers of Greenland